César Bazán Pérez (born 13 December 1974) is a Mexican former professional boxer who competed from 1992 to 2012. He held the WBC lightweight title from 1998 to 1999.

Professional career
Bazán grew up in Colonia Valle Gómez and turned pro at age 17 to make some money. He made his professional debut on 13 April 1992, defeating Miguel Pérez on points in Mexico City.

WBC lightweight title
Bazán captured the WBC lightweight title by upsetting an undefeated Stevie Johnston in 1998. Bazan defended the belt twice before losing it in a rematch to Johnston in 1999, even though Johnston had a point deducted in Round 3 for punching to the back of Bazan's head.

Bazán vs. Castillo
In 2001 César took on WBC lightweight champion, José Luis Castillo but went on to lose the championship bout.

He has not fought for a title since, although he continues to fight and recently lost a split decision to Cristian Bejarano in a foul filled fight in which Bazan was docked a point for a low blow in the fourth and Bejarano was docked a point for a headbutt in the 11th.

Retirement
César lost a light-welterweight bout to Irish fighter Paul McCloskey on a decision in Donegal, Ireland, on 29 March 2008. Although he attacked McCloskey very little during the fight, he did display some durability, as he took considerable punishment and lasted to the finish. He later moved to El Paso.

See also
List of Mexican boxing world champions
List of WBC world champions
List of lightweight boxing champions

References

External links

Boxers from Mexico City
World boxing champions
World Boxing Council champions
World lightweight boxing champions
Welterweight boxers
Light-welterweight boxers
Lightweight boxers
1974 births
Living people
Mexican male boxers